Gordon Wallace Scott (1 October 1887 – 14 December 1940) was a Canadian politician.

Born in Montreal, Quebec, Scott appointed Treasurer in the cabinet of Louis-Alexandre Taschereau on October 16, 1930. He was the unusucessful Liberal candidate for the riding of Huntingdon in a by-election held on November 4, 1930 losing to Martin Fisher. He held the role of Treasurer until November 27. He was appointed to the Legislative Council of Quebec for Wellington on November 13, 1930 and was made a minister without portfolio as well. He resigned on August 4, 1931 to run as the Liberal candidate in the riding of Montréal–Saint-Georges in the 1931 election. He was defeated by Charles Ernest Gault and was re-appointed to the Legislative Council on June 17, 1932 for the Victoria division.

He died while in office on December 14, 1940 during the rescue operations carried out in the Atlantic Ocean after the sinking of the steamer Western Prince by the German submarine U-96 during World War II. He was accompanying C. D. Howe to Britain to examine the British war effort and Canada's assistance to it, and was  killed trying to climb from the lifeboat to the rescuing ship (Howe survived).

References

1887 births
1940 deaths
Canadian civilians killed in World War II
Politicians from Montreal
People who died at sea
Quebec Liberal Party MLCs